B. juncea may refer to:

 Baccharis juncea, a New World plant
 Baumea juncea, a rhizomatous herb
 Bebbia juncea, an aromatic shrub
 Belonogaster juncea, a paper wasp
 Bouteloua juncea, a true grass
 Brassica juncea, a mustard plant